Andrew D'Angelo  (born November 2, 1965) is an American jazz musician.

Career 
D'Angelo was raised in Seattle, where he met Chris Speed and Jim Black, before he moved to New York City in 1985. He worked again with Speed in Boston, where they collaborated with the guitarist Kurt Rosenwinkel in the band Human Feel. He also played in the Either/Orchestra. The band members then moved to Brooklyn in the early 1990s. D'Angelo played in the bands of Erik Friedlander, Bobby Previte, Jamie Saft/Cuong Vu, Reid Anderson, and Ed Schuller in the band Orange Then Blue and began a long collaboration with the drummer Matt Wilson.

D'Angelo has composed music for big band, chamber music, string ensembles, and soloists. His trio Morthana released the albums Skadra Degis (Skirl Records) with Jim Black and Trevor Dunn. With his band Make Music he collaborated with pianist Josh Roseman and tenor saxophonist Bill McHenry.

With his trio of drummer Jim Black and bassist Trevor Dunn he released Skadra Degis (2008) and Norman (2014).

Discography

As leader
 Terpsichorea #2 (Falcata-Galia, 2002)
 Torn Between Two Horses (Duration, 2005)
 Skadra Degis (Skirl, 2008)
 Norman (Human Use, 2014)
 DNA Orchestra (Human Use, 2020)

With Human Feel
 Human Feel (Human Use, 1989)
 Scatter (GM, 1991)
 Welcome to Malpesta (New World, 1994)
 Speak to It (Songlines, 1996)
 Galore (Skirl, 2007)
 Gold (Intakt, 2019)

With Bureau of Atomic Tourism
 Arco Idaho (Rat/Bureau of Atomic Tourism, 2013)
 Second Law of Thermodynamics (Rat/Bureau of Atomic Tourism, 2013)
 Scintigraphy (Rat/Bureau of Atomic Tourism, 2014)
 Spinning Jenny (Rat/Bureau of Atomic Tourism, 2014)
 Hapax Legomena (Rat/Bureau of Atomic Tourism, 2015)

As sideman
With Erik Friedlander
 Chimera (Avant, 1995)
 Iza (MP3.com, 1996)
 The Watchman (Tzadik, 1996)

With Hilmar Jensson
 Dofinn (Jazzis, 1995)
 Kerfill (Smekkleysa, 1999)
 Tyft (Songlines, 2002)
 Ditty Blei (Songlines, 2004)

With Matt Wilson
 Going Once Going Twice (Palmetto, 1998)
 Humidity (Palmetto, 2003)
 Smile (Palmetto, 1999)
 That's Gonna Leave a Mark (Palmetto, 2009)

With others
 Jakob Bro, Hymnotic/Salmodisk (Loveland, 2015)
 Either/Orchestra, The Brunt (Accurate, 1994)
 Either/Orchestra, Across the Omniverse (Accurate, 1996)
 Chris Lightcap, Deluxe (Clean Feed, 2010)
 Orange Then Blue, Hold the Elevator (GM, 1999)
 Bobby Previte, Too Close to the Pole (Enja, 1996)
 Kurt Rosenwinkel, Heartcore (Verve, 2003)
 Jamie Saft & Cuong Vu, Ragged Jack (Avant, 1996)
 Ken Schaphorst, After Blue (Accurate, 1991)
 Ed Schuller, The Force (Tutu, 1996)
 Gunhild Seim, Time Jungle (Drollehala, 2007)

Bibliography
 Richard Cook, Brian Morton: The Penguin Guide to Jazz Recordings. 8th edition. Penguin, London 2006, .

References

External links 

Bass clarinetists
American jazz saxophonists
American male saxophonists
American jazz composers
American male jazz composers
1965 births
Living people
21st-century American saxophonists
21st-century clarinetists
21st-century American male musicians
Orange Then Blue members
Human Feel members